This is a list of notable Dutch politicians who have a research doctorate. This does not include any honorary doctorates.

Current members of cabinet

Current members of the states general

Current and former prime ministers

References

Lists of Dutch politicians